Bayan Lepas is a state constituency in Penang, Malaysia, that has been represented in the Penang State Legislative Assembly since 1959. It covers the southwestern corner of Penang Island, including the old quarter of the town of Bayan Lepas and fishing villages along the island's southern coast.

The state constituency was first contested in 1959 and is mandated to return a single Assemblyman to the Penang State Legislative Assembly under the first-past-the-post voting system. , the State Assemblyman for Bayan Lepas is Azrul Mahathir Aziz from the National Trust Party (Amanah), which is part of the state's ruling coalition, Pakatan Harapan (PH).

Definition

Polling districts 
According to the federal gazette issued on 30 March 2018, the Bayan Lepas constituency is divided into 8 polling districts.

It encompasses the southwestern tip of Penang Island and much of the island's southern coastline, covering the old town centre of Bayan Lepas immediately west of the Penang International Airport.  The fishing villages along the southern coastline of Penang Island, such as Teluk Kumbar and Gertak Sanggul, also fall under this constituency.

Demographics

History

Election results 
The electoral results for the Bayan Lepas state constituency in 2008, 2013 and 2018 are as follows.

See also 
 Constituencies of Penang

References 

Penang state constituencies